Amir Hossain (30 November 1957 - 24 August 2021) was a Bangladeshi judge of the Supreme Court of Bangladesh High Court Division. He was a member of International Crimes Tribunal (Bangladesh).

Early life and education 
Justice Amir was born on 30 November 1957 in Nilkli, Kishoreganj District to Abdus Samad and Syedunnesa. He obtained Secondary School Certificate from Nikli GC Pilot High School in 1973, Higher Secondary School Certificate from Gurudayal Government College in 1975. He obtained his LL.B and LL.M degree from the Department of Law, University of Dhaka.

Career 

Hossain participated in the Bangladesh Liberation War in 1971. He was trained in guerilla warfare in the Mukti Bahini camps in the free territories. As a freedom fighter he directly engaged in several battles within Sunamganj, Netrokona and Kishoreganj sub-division under Sector 3.

Hossain joined the Judiciary of Bangladesh as Munsif (Assistant Judge) on 22 February 1984 and was promoted as a District and Sessions Judge on 6 May 2009. He was elevated as an Additional Judge of the Supreme Court of Bangladesh, High Court Division on 12 February 2015 and was appointed as a Judge of the same division on 12 February 2017.

On 11 October 2017, Hossain was appointed as a member of the International Crimes Tribunal (Bangladesh)-1. As a member of the tribunal he passed several judgements against several perpetrators in the Liberation War of Bangladesh 1971 for their transgression against humanity.

Death 
Hossain died on 24 August 2021 at Combined Military Hospital, Dhaka, Bangladesh. He was buried in Nilkli, Kishoreganj.

References 

1957 births
2021 deaths
People from Kishoreganj District
University of Dhaka alumni
Mukti Bahini personnel
20th-century Bangladeshi judges
Supreme Court of Bangladesh justices
21st-century Bangladeshi judges